Dario Van den Buijs (born 12 September 1995) is a Belgian professional footballer who plays as a centre-back for Dutch club RKC Waalwijk. He formerly played for Club Brugge, Heracles Almelo and FC Eindhoven.

Club career
On 30 August 2021, he signed a four-year contract with RKC Waalwijk.

Personal life
His father Stan van den Buijs was a professional footballer with Lierse and KV Mechelen and his grandfather Herman Helleputte played for Lierse and managed Beveren.

References

External links
 
 Voetbal International profile 

1995 births
People from Lier, Belgium
Living people
Association football central defenders
Belgian footballers
Club Brugge KV players
FC Eindhoven players
Heracles Almelo players
K Beerschot VA players
Fortuna Sittard players
RKC Waalwijk players
Eredivisie players
Eerste Divisie players
Belgian Pro League players
Belgian expatriate footballers
Expatriate footballers in the Netherlands
Belgian expatriate sportspeople in the Netherlands
Footballers from Antwerp Province